Marlena Rybacha (born 16 September 1987) is a Polish field hockey player. She is the current captain of both the Poland national indoor and outdoor teams.

Personal life
Marlena Rybacha was born and raised in Nysa, Poland. She began playing hockey at age 11 in a team coached by her aunt. Rybacha currently resides in Den Bosch in the Netherlands, and plays for Dutch club HC Oranje-Rood.

Rybacha has a master's degree in physical education, which she achieved at AWF in Poznań.

Club career
Before transitioning to HC Oranje-Rood, Rybacha played for fellow Dutch club MOP Vught.

International career
Rybacha has played in three Indoor World Cups; 2011 in Poznań, 2015 in Leipzig and 2018 in Berlin.

In 2019, Rybacha was named in the Poland squad for the FIH Series Finals in Hiroshima, Japan.

References

External links
 

1987 births
Living people
People from Nysa, Poland
Polish female field hockey players
Female field hockey defenders
HC Oranje-Rood players
Expatriate field hockey players
Polish expatriate sportspeople in the Netherlands
2018 FIH Indoor Hockey World Cup players